Seven Percent Solution was an American rock band formed in Austin, Texas who played psychedelic atmospheric rock during 1992–2003. They were a part of the 1990s shoegazing, space rock genre. Known for melodic, moody songs, they combined introspective lyrics and vocals with an experimental use of guitars and a more "classic rock"-style rhythm section.

Seven Percent Solution recorded two full-length CDs and various cassette tapes and singles. Many of their releases came in handmade covers and limited editions. Most famously their first CD All About Satellites and SpaceShips came with an extra copy of the CD in its own cover with the instruction "Give this copy to a friend". The band developed a loyal following through college radio and praise from magazines such as Rolling Stone, Magnet, Option, CMJ, and Pop Culture Press. Overseas they were featured in magazines such as Losing Today and Ptolemaic Terrascope. They toured regularly throughout the United States. Due to working on other projects and members relocating to other states, the band played its last shows in 2004.

Band members

Reese Beeman - Vocals, guitar, bass, drums 1992–2004
James Adkisson - Guitar 1993–2004
Julian Capps - Guitar, bass, vocals 1997–2004
Mike Sherrill - Bass 1998–2004
Scott Sasser - Drums 1992–1998
Bob Smoot - Bass 1992–1996
Dwayn Moore - Bass 1996–1997
George Reyes - Bass 1997–1998
Sean McGee - Drums 1998–2001
James Harwood - Drums 2001–2004

Discography

All About Satellites and Spaceships CD
Released in 1996 on the band's own X-ray label. Recorded and mixed by Reese Beeman in his garage studio. It was mastered by Charles Reeves. The initial release came in a handmade cover by the Chicago-based Fireproof Press. In addition the band made their own cover that fit into a pocket of the main cover containing a second copy of the CD. With the instruction to "give this copy to a friend".
Eventually in 1998 a single-CD jewel case version was released. From 1996 through 1998 Satellites received praise from a wide range of publications, most notably from Rolling Stone, with a review by the well-known rock historian David Fricke. It was later included in Rolling Stone online's List of Albums That Mattered in 1998. Madonna - Ray of Light, Lauryn Hill - The Miseducation of Lauryn Hill, Jeff Buckley - Sketches, Air - Moon Safari, 7% Solution - All About Satellites and Spaceships, Beastie Boys - Hello Nasty. The CD topped at number 20 on the CMJ music charts.

Reese Beeman - Vocals, guitar,
Scott Sasser - Drums,
Dwayn Moore - Bass,
James Adkisson - Guitar

 All About Satellites and Spaceships
 Built on Sand
 Revolve
 Happy?
 Air Bends Sunlight
 Your Kingdom, Your World
 Road and the Common
 Snuff Gold and Gold Tilings
 Blindshore
 Lost
 Sky Suspended

Gabriel's Waltz CD
Released in 1999 on the band's own X-ray label. Recorded and mixed by Reese Beeman. In the middle of recording their second CD drummer Scott Sasser had to suddenly depart the band. In an attempt to finish the CD without a drummer the band sifted through the recordings of songs that were most complete and noticed a similarity. Many of the songs were in waltz time. It so happened that waltz steps can be thought of as a metaphor for the cycle of life. So that became a theme.
The cusp of the new millennium was also a theme. Addressing the complicated feelings associated with the endings of things and change. The cover art included wood engravings from a 1545 series titled The Dance of Death by Hans Holbein. A limited hand numbered gatefold paperboard edition was also released on Lone Starfighter Records. This version included an extra song. A cover version of the song Oh Yeah. Originally by the German band Can In the music press Gabriel's Waltz received outstanding reviews but not in the same measure as their first CD.

Reese Beeman - Vocals, guitar,
Scott Sasser - Drums,
Julian Capps - Bass, guitar,
James Adkisson - Guitar, Omnichord

Dear Anne
The End Of Faith
Carousel
Bruise
Threshold
Lullaby
The Innocentes
Dust And Ashes
Gabriel's Waltz
 Oh Yeah - limited edition version-

7-inch single releases
 "Sugar / Halo" released 1993 on X-ray Records
 "Lullaby / Oh Yeah" (Can cover) 1998 on Hidden Agenda

Cassette releases
 7% Solution released 1993 on Beesmasser
Reese Beeman -Vocals, guitar
Bob Smoot- Bass
Scott Sasser - Drums

Take it Back
Cycle
Waiting for the Rain
Veil
Believe
Valentine
Walk
Threshold

Sugar
Released 1994 on X-ray Records

Reese Beeman -Vocals, guitar
Bob Smoot- Bass
Scott Sasser, Drums
James Adkisson - Guitar
Halo
Bruise
Top Half of the Earth
Carousel
Sometimes Never
Sugar
Light
Time and Waiting

Covers tape
A fans-only Christmas gift 1997 on X-ray records
The Beatles - Tomorrow Never Knows
Can - Oh Yeah
Pink Floyd - Astronomy Domine
Opal - Super Nova

Live performance
Live their sets featured film and light shows and a long list of eclectic cover songs. Many of the first Seven Percent Solution shows included setting out rugs and pillows for the audience with the band playing in silk pajamas. The shows incorporated 2 to 3 16mm projectors, spinning color wheels and liquid light projections. Later they used VCRs and DVD players to show their own home made videos. The sets generally included at least one cover song. The Beatles - Tomorrow Never Knows, Can - Oh Yeah, Pink Floyd - Astronomy Domine, Opal - Super Nova, Nina Simone - Lilac Wine, Leonard Cohen - Hallelujah, Jeff Buckley - Lover, Radiohead - Palo Alto,You and Whose Army, Massive Attack - Angel, Portishead - Over, Van Morrison - Sweet Thing, Stereolab - Metronomic Underground, The Cure - Like Cockatoos, The Monkees - Porpoise Song, Loop - Be Here Now

The Ebow
The band became known for its extensive and creative use of a guitar effects device called the Ebow. The EBow is a hand-held electronic device for guitar. The small battery-powered device replaces the pick in the right hand. The EBow produces an infinite sustain, letting the guitarist mimic strings, horns, and woodwinds. Seven Percent Solution is mentioned on the E-Bow website and included in a listing of musicians and bands found in the E-bow packaging.

Present day

In 2010 Seven Percent Solution played two reunion shows in Austin Texas. They also formed a new band HeadShy that includes past Seven Percent Solution members Reese Beeman, James Adkisson, and Mike Sherrill and with the addition of Lisa Lipkin and Wayne Duncan. James Adkisson and James Harwood recorded and performed with A Five and Dime Ship James Adkisson has recorded two solo projects. Blindshore and Dirac C Mike Sherrill and Sean McGee are also members of King Air.

References

External links
 Seven Percent Solution website https://web.archive.org/web/20111105005911/http://www.sevenpercent.com/
 Aural Innovations Gabriel's Waltz review http://www.aural-innovations.com/issues/issue7/sevper.html
 Austin Chronicle Interview http://www.austinchronicle.com/issues/vol18/issue33/music.7percent.html

Rock music groups from Texas